Carboprost (INN, trade names for the tromethamine salts Hemabate, Tham) is a synthetic prostaglandin analogue of PGF2α (specifically, it is 15-methyl-PGF2α) with oxytocic properties.

Carboprost's main use is in the obstetrical emergency of postpartum hemorrhage which reduces postpartum bleeding during these circumstances.

Indication 
Used in postpartum hemorrhage caused by uterine atony not controlled by other methods. One study has shown that carboprost tromethamine is more effective than oxytocin in preventing postpartum hemorrhage in high-risk patients undergoing cesarean delivery. Carboprost is also used for the termination of pregnancy in the 2nd trimester.

Unlabeled use:
 Hemorrhagic Cystitis
 PID

Contraindication 
Contraindicated in severe cardiovascular, renal, and hepatic disease. It is also contraindicated in acute pelvic inflammatory disease. Hypersensitivity to carboprost or any of its components is also a contraindication Exert caution in asthmatic patients as carboprost may cause bronchospasm.

Precautions 
 asthma
 anemia
 jaundice
 diabetes mellitus
 seizure disorders
 past uterine surgery

Adverse Effects 
 diarrhea (most common, may be sudden in onset)
 flushing or hot flashes
 fever
 chills
 nausea/vomiting

Storage and Availability 
Carboprost is supplied with its salt derivative tromethamine in 1 milliliter ampules containing a 250 microgram/milliliter solution of the active drug. The drug must be refrigerated at a temperature between 2 – 8 degrees Celsius.

Synthesis 
A significant deactivating metabolic transformation of natural prostaglandins is enzymatic oxidation of the C-15 hydroxyl to the corresponding ketone. This is prevented, with retention of activity, by methylation to give the C-15 tertiary carbinol series.

This molecular feature is readily introduced at the stage of the Corey lactone (1) by reaction with methyl Grignard reagent or trimethylaluminium. The resulting mixture of tertiary carbinols (2) is transformed to oxytocic carboprost (3) by standard transformations, including separation of diastereomers, so that the final product is the C-15 analogue. This diastereomer is reputably freeer of prostaglandin side effects than the C-15 (S) isomer.

See also 
Arbaprostil

References

Further reading

External links 
 

Orphan drugs
Prostaglandins